Oxford United Stars Football Club is a Northern Ireland football club, founded in 1937, based in Derry. It currently competes in the Northern Ireland Intermediate League. They are known as the U2's in reference to Oxford United's nickname 'The U's'. The club graduated to the second division of the Irish League after competing in local amateur leagues, including the Derry and District League, which the reserve team, Oxford United, now plays in.

History
Oxford United Stars was  formed in 1968 initially as a youth football team to compete in underage football competitions. The club achieved great success at this level and developed a highly successful youth academy which led to a steady stream of young footballers graduating through their ranks. The club then entered the junior football ranks through competed in competitions under the auspices of Irish Football Association.
Oxford United Stars played in North West Saturday Morning League under the auspices of the Irish Football Association and in all the major summer cup competitions throughout the north west of Ireland with great success winning all the major honours. In 1976 the club applied for senior status and were elected to the newly formed Northern Ireland Intermediate League in 1978. Oxford United Stars have established a very successful youth structure, through which many successful players have progressed through their ranks.

Club colours
In 1965 the club adopted the black and blue strips, similar to that of Inter Milan. These colours remain synonymous with Oxford United.

League status
Oxford United Stars entered the IFA Intermediate League in 2004, but failed to obtain a place in the IFA Championship which replaced that league in 2008. Instead, the club competed in the IFA Interim League during 2008–09. It failed again to gain a place in the Championship in 2009 and dropped back to the Northern Ireland Intermediate League in which it had played prior to 2004. The reserve team competes in the Derry and District League Premier Division and the most senior youth team competes in the First Division of the Sunday Morning League.

Honours

Intermediate honours
Craig Memorial Cup: 1
1995–96
Northern Ireland Intermediate League: 5
1986–87, 1988–89, 1995–96, 1996–97, 1997–98, 2009–10, 2013–14
Northern Ireland Intermediate League Cup
 2011, 2012
Northern Ireland Challenge Cup
 2013, 2014, 2016

Youth honours
Under 9
Tobermore Cup: 2009

Under 10
 Derry & District League Championship: 2010
 North West League Champions: 2007–08
 Derry & District Cup Winners: 2007
 Glen Cup Winners: 2007, 2008, 2010
 McAuley Cup Winners: 2008
 St Patricks Day Cup Winners: 2008
 NW&CDYL Plate Winners: 2009
 Andrew Aiken Cup Winners: 2009, 2011
 Green Island Friendship Shield Winners: 2016

Under 11
 Derry & District Youth League Champions: 2008, 2009, 2012
 Derry & District League Cup Winners: 2008, 2009, 2011, 2012
 Derry & District Cup Winners: 2008, 2009, 2012
 NW&CDYL Champions: 2008–09
 NW&CDYL Cup Winners: 2008–09
 Peter McGowan Memorial: 2008
 Tobermore Cup: 2007, 2008
 Andrew Aiken Cup Winners: 2009
 Andrew Aiken Plate Winners: 2010
 Derry & District Team of the Year: 2009
 North West Sports Team Of The Year: 2009

Under 12
 Derry & District League Champions: 2008, 2009
 North West League Champions: 2007–08
 NW&CDYL League Champions: 2008–09
 NW&CDYL Cup Winners: 2008–09
 St Patricks Day Cup: 2008
 Glen Cup Winners:  2008, 2009
 Andrew Aiken Cup Winners: 2008, 2010, 2011
 Andrew Plate winners: 2009
 National League Plate Winners: 2010
 Northwest Invitational Cup: 2011

Under 13
 International Tournament Scotland Cup: 2009
 Tobermore Cup: 2009
 Derry & District League Championship: 2009
 Umbro Galway Cup Runners Up: 2010
 Derry and District League Cup: 2011
 NIBFA Cup Runners-Up: 2012
 National League Cup Winners: 2012

Under 14
 North West Invitational Cup: 2010
 Derry & District League Championship: 2010
 NIBFA Cup Winners: 2012
 Northern Ireland Cup Winners, 2012
 Foyle Shield Winners: 2012
 NIBFA National League Cup Winners: 2013

Under 15
 Derry & District Cup Winners: 2011
 Derry & District Cup Winners: 2014

Under 16
Derry & District League Championship: 2012, 2013
Derry & District League Cup: 2013, 2013
Derry & District Cup: 2012, 2013

Current squad

Notable former players
David Campbell
Peter Hutton
Tony Gorman
Daniel Lafferty

Association football clubs in Derry Urban Area
Association football clubs in Northern Ireland
Association football clubs established in 1937
1937 establishments in Northern Ireland